is a Japanese javelin thrower. He was the first Japanese athlete to win a World Championship medal in the javelin, taking bronze at the 2009 edition with a throw of 82.97 metres.

He was successful as a junior athlete and won the bronze medal in the javelin at the 1998 World Junior Championships in Athletics. He established himself as one of Asia's top throwers in the following years, winning silver medals at the 2001 East Asian Games, 2002 Asian Games, and the 2003 Asian Athletics Championships.

His first global appearance was at the 2004 Summer Olympics and he finished 18th overall in the final rankings. The 2005 World Championships in Athletics was his next major tournament but he finished in 27th place with a disappointing throw of 68.31 m. He was runner-up for a second time at the 2006 Asian Games and took part in the 2008 Summer Olympics two years later.

Murakami was voted the Japanese athlete of the year for 2009 by both Rikujyo Kyougi Magazine (Track and Field Magazine of Japan) and the Japan Association of Athletics Federations. These awards capped a decade of national dominance – with ten consecutive wins, he won the javelin at every national championships in the 2000s. His performance at the 2009 World Championships included a personal best of 83.10 m to qualify for the final, and 82.97 m to win the bronze medal – his second best ever throw. He finished the year with a gold medal performance at the 2009 Asian Athletics Championships.

He started 2010 with a throw of 82.49 m in Wakayama in April – his longest throw achieved in Japan. He extended his consecutive national title run to eleven in June, out-throwing Nobuhiro Sato by four metres.

On April 29, 2013, he extended his personal best by more than 2 meters to 85.96, more than 1 meter longer than London Olympic winning throw, and 2nd best by a Japanese javelin thrower after Kazuhiro Mizoguchi.

International competitions

Seasonal bests by year
1997 - 76.54
1998 - 73.62
1999 - 71.70
2000 - 78.57
2001 - 80.59
2002 - 78.77
2003 - 78.98
2004 - 81.71
2005 - 79.79
2006 - 78.54
2007 - 79.85
2008 - 79.71
2009 - 83.10
2010 - 83.15
2011 - 83.53
2012 - 83.95
2013 - 85.96
2014 - 81.66
2015 - 79.05

References
General
 
JAAF profile for  
Specific

1979 births
Living people
Japanese male javelin throwers
Olympic male javelin throwers
Olympic athletes of Japan
Athletes (track and field) at the 2004 Summer Olympics
Athletes (track and field) at the 2008 Summer Olympics
Athletes (track and field) at the 2012 Summer Olympics
Asian Games gold medalists for Japan
Asian Games silver medalists for Japan
Asian Games gold medalists in athletics (track and field)
Asian Games medalists in athletics (track and field)
Athletes (track and field) at the 2002 Asian Games
Athletes (track and field) at the 2006 Asian Games
Athletes (track and field) at the 2010 Asian Games
Athletes (track and field) at the 2014 Asian Games
Medalists at the 2002 Asian Games
Medalists at the 2006 Asian Games
Medalists at the 2010 Asian Games
Competitors at the 2001 Summer Universiade
World Athletics Championships athletes for Japan
World Athletics Championships medalists
Asian Athletics Championships winners
Japan Championships in Athletics winners
20th-century Japanese people
21st-century Japanese people